The Álvaro Obregón Dam (also known as the Oviáchic Dam) is an embankment dam on the Yaqui River north of Ciudad Obregón, in Sonora, Mexico. The purpose of the dam is water supply for irrigation, flood control and hydroelectric power production. The dam supports a power station with two generators and a 19 MW installed capacity.

Background
Because of drought, the Álvaro Obregón Dam and others on the Sonora and Mayo Rivers were constructed in the 1940s and 1950s. Construction on the Álvaro Obregón Dam began in 1947 and was complete in 1952. The dam's power station was not operational until August 1957. The dam has an additional saddle dam  to its northwest and along with a system of canals, it helps irrigate 83% of a  area. Because of drought in the 1990s and 2000s, 2004 was the first year that water from the dam's reservoir was not authorized for irrigation.

See also

List of power stations in Mexico

References

Dams in Mexico
Hydroelectric power stations in Mexico
Embankment dams
Dams completed in 1952